Syngenite is an uncommon potassium calcium sulfate mineral with formula K2Ca(SO4)2·H2O. It forms as prismatic monoclinic crystals and as encrustations.

Discovery and occurrence
It was first described in 1872 for an occurrence as druse on halite in the Kalusa Salt deposit, Ivanovo-Frankovsk Oblast', Ukraine. The name is from Greek 'συγγενής' (related) due to its chemical similarity to polyhalite.

It occurs in marine evaporite deposits as a diagenetic phase. It also forms as a volcanic sublimate, as vein fillings in geothermal fields and in caves where it is derived from bat guano.  It occurs in association with halite and arcanite in salt deposits; and with biphosphammite, aphthitalite, monetite, whitlockite, uricite, brushite and gypsum in cave environments.

It is also found in hardened cement which has relatively higher amount of potassium.

Production
Syngenite can be artificially produced by the action of a potassium sulfate solution on gypsum.

References

Bibliography
Palache, P.; Berman H.; Frondel, C. (1960). "Dana's System of Mineralogy, Volume II: Halides, Nitrates, Borates, Carbonates, Sulfates, Phosphates, Arsenates, Tungstates, Molybdates, Etc. (Seventh Edition)" John Wiley and Sons, Inc., New York, pp. 442-444.

Sulfate minerals
Monoclinic minerals
Minerals in space group 11